London-Sire Records was an American-based record label owned by Warner Music Group, created in August 1999 with the merging of Warner Music Group's struggling Sire Records Group and the US division of London Recordings, which WMG had acquired from Universal Music Group following their merger with PolyGram in December 1998.  Seymour Stein remained at the helm as CEO, with Peter Koepke acting as co-head. However, the binding of the two companies proved to be largely unsuccessful, and failed to produce a hit. The label was shuttered by AOL Time Warner at the end of 2001, and played a role in the dissolution of AOL Time Warner's partnership in April 2003. Sire was later relaunched by Stein as an imprint of Warner Bros. Records.

Notable acts on the label included: Eden's Crush, Scene 23, Guster, Morcheeba, Harvey Danger, Aphex Twin, Orbital, Artful Dodger, Sugababes, The Avalanches, The Tragically Hip, Downthesun and 40 Below Summer.

The label also included Essential Records (London) founded by Pete Tong in London, England, which released dance music compilations from well known DJs and artists such as Paul Oakenfold, Fatboy Slim, Carl Cox, John Digweed, Boy George, DJ Skribble, DJ Icey, and Peter Rauhofer.

Past artists 
This is a list of all the artists who were signed to London-Sire Records.

 40 Below Summer
 All Saints
 Artful Dodger
 The Avalanches
 Downthesun
 Eden's Crush
 Elan
 The English Beat
 The Essentials
 Grand Theft Audio
 Guster
 Harvey Danger
 Kaci Battaglia
 Mandy Barnett
 Morcheeba
 Orbital
 Paul Oakenfold
 Pet Shop Boys
 Sugababes
 The Tragically Hip

See also

 List of record labels

References

American record labels
Record labels established in 1999
Record labels disestablished in 2003
Warner Music labels
Pop record labels
1999 establishments in the United States